Mišo Dubljanić (born 20 December 1999) is a Montenegrin football goalkeeper who plays for FK Spartak Subotica in the Serbian SuperLiga.

Club career
Born in Nikšić, he started playing in the youth levels of local FK Sutjeska Nikšić from where he moved to the Czech Republic to sign with SK Dynamo České Budějovice by early 2018. Failing to debut for the first team and playing mostly for the reserves team, Dubljanic decides to leave and sign with Serbian side FK Spartak Subotica. He debuted with Spartak in the 2019–20 Serbian SuperLiga and has surprisingly, due to his age, become their main goalkeeper that season.

References

1999 births
Living people
Footballers from Nikšić
Association football goalkeepers
Montenegrin footballers
SK Dynamo České Budějovice players
FK Spartak Subotica players
Serbian SuperLiga players
Montenegrin expatriate footballers
Expatriate footballers in the Czech Republic
Montenegrin expatriate sportspeople in the Czech Republic
Expatriate footballers in Serbia
Montenegrin expatriate sportspeople in Serbia